Evelyn Tweed is a Scottish politician who has been the Member of the Scottish Parliament (MSP) for Stirling since 2021. A member of the Scottish National Party (SNP), she has been a councillor in Stirling for Trossachs and Teith ward since 2017.

Early life and career 
Tweed was born in Ayr, in the west of Scotland. She attended the University of the West of Scotland and Heriot-Watt University. She previously worked as a housing professional with Cube. Tweed was a member of the Board of the Chartered Institute of Housing Scotland from 2007 to 2009. She was the Director of Investment at Loreburn Housing Association.

Political career 
In the 2017 Scottish local elections, Tweed was elected to the Stirling council, representing the Trossachs and Teith ward. She became the council's public safety commission convener following the resignation of Maureen Bennison.

In June 2022 she apologised after being photographed holding the flag of the ultra-nationalist group Siol nan Gaidheal.

Member of the Scottish Parliament 
Tweed was selected as the SNP's candidate for the Stirling constituency in the 2021 Scottish Parliament election. After a successful campaign, she succeeded retiring MSP Bruce Crawford, as the MSP for Stirling.

Personal life 
Tweed lives in Stirling with her husband, Ahsan Khan, and their two children. She enjoys running and reading in her spare time.

References

External links 
 

Year of birth missing (living people)
Living people
Scottish National Party MSPs
Members of the Scottish Parliament 2021–2026
Scottish National Party councillors
Female members of the Scottish Parliament